The Kokang Democracy and Unity Party (KDUP) is a political party in Myanmar (Burma) representing the interests of the Kokang Chinese and the administration in the Kokang Self-Administered Zone.

History 
The party contested four constituencies in the 1990 general elections, receiving 0.07% of the vote and failing to win a seat. The KDUP was re-established in 2010, and in the 2010 elections, it contested constituencies in Lashio, Kunlong and Hsenwi Townships in Shan State, but again failed to win a seat.

The KDUP contested one House of Nationalities seat in the 2012 by-elections, Shan State's Constituency No. 3, fielding party's chairman, Luo Xingguang, who was believed to have ties to drug traffickers Lo Hsing Han and Liu Guoxi. In the 2015 elections the party succeeded in winning a seat in the House of Representatives and one seat in the Shan State Hluttaw.

References 

Political parties in Myanmar
Political parties established in 2010
2010 establishments in Myanmar
Kokang
Chinese nationalist political parties